This is a list of countries by platinum production. It is based on information from the United States Geological Survey.

References

Lists of countries by mineral production
Platinum